The Bentonville Arkansas Temple is a temple of the Church of Jesus Christ of Latter-day Saints (LDS Church) under construction in Bentonville, Arkansas. The Bentonville Arkansas Temple will be the LDS Church's first temple in the state of Arkansas.

History 
On October 5, 2019, during the church's general conference, church president Russell M. Nelson announced plans to construct the Bentonville Arkansas Temple.

The temple's location was announced on April 23, 2020, on an 8.8 acre lot adjacent to a current meetinghouse on McCollum Drive.

On August 28, 2020, the LDS Church released an exterior rendering of the temple and announced that a groundbreaking ceremony would be held on in November 2020, with David A. Bednar, a member of the Quorum of the Twelve Apostles, presiding remotely at the event. The groundbreaking took place on November 7, 2020, the same date on which ground was broken for the Red Cliffs Utah Temple.

See also 

 The Church of Jesus Christ of Latter-day Saints in Arkansas
 Comparison of temples of The Church of Jesus Christ of Latter-day Saints
 List of temples of The Church of Jesus Christ of Latter-day Saints
 List of temples of The Church of Jesus Christ of Latter-day Saints by geographic region
 Temple architecture (Latter-day Saints)

References 

Temples (LDS Church) in the United States
Religious buildings and structures in Arkansas
Proposed religious buildings and structures of the Church of Jesus Christ of Latter-day Saints
Temples (LDS Church) in North America
The Church of Jesus Christ of Latter-day Saints in Arkansas
21st-century Latter Day Saint temples
Religious organizations based in Arkansas
Buildings and structures under construction in the United States